Koja Zaharia or Koja Zakaria (? – before 1442) was an Albanian nobleman and a member of the Zaharia family.

Name 

In Ragusan documents he is referred to as Kojčin or Gojčin. Because of that, many scholars like Nicolae Iorga, Ludwig Thalloczy and Konstantin Jireček have mistakenly believed he was actually Gojčin Crnojević.

His name is rendered by Robert Elsie as Koja Zacharia or Koja Zakarija.

Family 
His wife was Bosa (Boxia), daughter of Leka Dukagjin who was a father of Tanush Major Dukagjini. Their children were Lekë Zaharia (son), Bolja (daughter) and a daughter of unknown name who married Đurađ Đurašević Crnojević. Koja died sometime before 1442. According to Ćiro Truhelka Bolja Zaharia was married to Petar Vojsalić, while according to Aleksa Ivić she was married to Petar I Pavlović. Koja's widow Boša died in Scutari on 19 September 1448 when a lot of people died during a fire in the town.

Allegiances

Lordship of Zeta 

Until 1395 Koja Zaharia was castellan of Sati, which belonged to a fief of Konstantin Balšić and was part of the Lordship of Zeta under Đurađ II Balšić. In 1395 Balšić ceded Sati (with Dagnum) together with Scutari and Drivast to the Venetian Republic (in order to create a buffer zone between his Zeta and the Ottoman Empire), but Zaharia refused to allow the Venetians to take control over Sati.

Ottoman Empire 

When Koja captured the castle of Dagnum in 1396 he proclaimed himself the Lord of Sati and Dagnum ("dominus Sabatensis et Dagnensis") and from there he ruled the territory around it as an Ottoman vassal. In October 1400 Koja proposed to the Venetians to simulate a battle in which he and his cousin Dhimitër Jonima would pretend to lose their possessions to the Venetians, in exchange for provision of 500 ducats annually. The Venetians did not promptly respond and Koja returned to the sultan. In 1402, together with other Albanian noblemen, he fought alongside Bayezid I forces, in the Battle of Ankara.

Venetian Republic and Serbian Despotate 

In 1403, a year after the Ottomans were defeated in the Battle of Ankara, Koja together with his vassal Dhimitër Jonima accepted Venetian suzerainty. During the First Scutari War between Zeta and Venetian Republic, he supported Venetian forces. 

Around 1412, Koja's daughter Bolja married Balša III and in return Balša III allowed him to administer Budva. At that time Koja's other daughter was already married to a member of Đuraševići who held the most distinguished position in Balša's court. To bring Koja even closer, Balša appointed him as castellan of Budva. After the death of Balša III (28 April 1421), Koja's daughter Bolja together with her two daughters returned to her family in Dagnum. Koja Zaharia supported Serbian despot Stefan Lazarević until he was defeated by Venice in December 1422. Although Venetian admiral Francesco Bembo offered money to Gjon Kastrioti, Dukagjins and to Koja Zaharija in April 1423 to join the Venetian forces against the Serbian Despotate (offering 200 ducats to Koja Zaharia), they refused. In one period Serbian despot Stefan Lazarević intended to financially destroy Koja Zaharia and ordered Ragusan traders to avoid paying taxes to Koja and to travel to Serbia via Lezhë not through Koja's Dagnum.

Ottoman Empire 

When Ishak Bey captured Dagnum from Koja Zaharia in 1430 it was attached to the territory controlled by Ali Beg, while Koja was either imprisoned or expelled. After the Albanian Revolt of 1432–1436 was crushed the sultan entrusted Koja's son Lekë Zaharia with a position of Dagnum's governor.

Family tree

References

Sources 

14th-century births
15th-century deaths
14th-century Albanian people
15th-century Albanian people
Koja
Albanian Roman Catholics
Castellans